Willis Elbert Mollison (September 15, 1859 - 1924) was a teacher, newspaper editor, politician, banker, businessman, lawyer, public official, and civil rights advocate in Mississippi. 

Robert and Martha née Gibson Mollison were his parents. He studied at Fisk University's college preparatory school and Oberlin College (class of 1883). He wrote a book The leading Afro-Americans of Vicksburg, Miss., their enterprises, churches, schools, lodges and societies published in 1908 about prominent African Americans in Vicksburg, Mississippi. His son Irvin C. Mollison also became a lawyer and served as president of the Cook County, Illinois Bar Association.

He published The Golden Rule a four-page weekly newspaper in Vicksburg, Mississippi. He moved to Chicago in 1917.

Irvin C. Mollison was his son.

Further reading
 Beacon Lights of the Race by Green Polonius Hamilton (1911)
 Entry by Irvin C. Mollison, Journal of Negro History 15, no. 1 (1930)
 Emancipation: The Making of the Black Lawyer, 1844–1944 by J. Clay Smith Jr. (1993)

References

1859 births
1924 deaths
People from Vicksburg, Mississippi